Asaad Kelada  (born May 11, 1940) is an American television director of many American television sitcoms.

Early life
Kelada was born in Cairo, Egypt and he studied drama under Youssef Chahine at the American University in Cairo. In 1961, he immigrated to the United States and studied directing at the Yale School of Drama.

Career
After directing stage plays and teaching drama in the 1960s and 1970s, he received his first opportunity directing television in 1976 with an episode of the sitcom Rhoda, "Rhoda Questions Her Life and Flies to Paris". Since that time he has directed episodes of several well-known sitcoms including Benson, WKRP in Cincinnati, The Facts of Life, Family Ties, and Who's the Boss?, for which he directed 117 episodes and also was a producer on 51 episodes.

Kelada spoke with DGA Magazine and said that good casting is essential to the success of a comedy, because "you cannot make the actor be funny". He said that where drama is "analytical," comedy is "much more technical. It's about rhythm, timing, pace, and energy."

Filmography

See also
 List of Copts
 Lists of Egyptians

References

External links

Egyptian emigrants to the United States
The American University in Cairo alumni
Yale School of Drama alumni
American television directors
Egyptian people of Coptic descent
American people of Coptic descent
Living people
1942 births
Mass media people from Cairo